Massasoit Fire House No. 5 is a historic former fire station located in Fall River, Massachusetts.

The building was designed by Boston architects Hartwell & Swasey and was built in 1873. This same firm also designed several other extant fire stations in Fall River during this period, including the Quequechan No. 1, Anawan No. 6 and Pocasset Firehouse No. 7. The building was originally designed to also contain a police station.

The firehouse was built to serve the Globe Village section of the city. It has since been replaced by the Globe/Kosior Fire Station on Globe Street.

It was added to the National Register of Historic Places in 1983. It now contains residential apartments.

See also
Academy Building
National Register of Historic Places listings in Fall River, Massachusetts
Pocasset Firehouse No. 7
Quequechan No. 1 and Anawan No. 6 are part of the Highlands Historic District

References

Fire stations completed in 1873
Fire stations on the National Register of Historic Places in Massachusetts
Buildings and structures in Fall River, Massachusetts
National Register of Historic Places in Fall River, Massachusetts
Defunct fire stations in Massachusetts